Thamnochrolechia is a genus of lichenized fungi in the Pertusariaceae family. The genus is monotypic, containing the single species Thamnochrolechia verticillata, found in Papua New Guinea.

References

Taxa described in 1991
Pertusariales
Monotypic Lecanoromycetes genera
Lichen genera
Taxa named by André Aptroot
Taxa named by Harrie Sipman